Noah Egidi Galvin (born May 6, 1994) is an American actor and singer. He is best known for playing Dr. Asher Wolke in the TV series The Good Doctor, Kenny O'Neal in the ABC sitcom The Real O'Neals and later taking over the titular role in the Broadway musical Dear Evan Hansen.

Early life
Galvin was born and raised in Katonah, New York. Galvin has two siblings, including multi-instrumentalist Yoke Lore. His father is Catholic, of Irish and Italian descent, and his mother, Abbie (née Fink), is Jewish; he was raised "both Jewish and Catholic going to CCD, Hebrew School and church," and has described himself as Jewish.

Acting career
Before starring in The Real O'Neals, he also appeared Off-Broadway for companies such as Signature, Playwrights Horizons, MCC, The Public, The Culture Project, The Flea, The Wild Project, New York Theatre Workshop, the Barrow Street Theater, Rattlestick, Ensemble Studio Theater, and many others. His audiobook work includes Stephen Chbosky's The Perks of Being a Wallflower and Matthew Quick's Forgive Me, Leonard Peacock.

In August 2017, Galvin was named as a temporary replacement for the title role in Dear Evan Hansen, after the departure of Ben Platt. Galvin assumed the role on November 21, 2017, and played his final performance on February 4, 2018. He also took part of the Broadway production Waitress, playing Ogie from April 29, 2019, to August 18, 2019, where Todrick Hall took over the role. In addition to his stage roles, Galvin also narrated the character part of Arthur in What If It's Us, a novel by Adam Silvera and Becky Albertalli. He subsequently narrated the Gimlet podcast, The Two Princes, which was released June 4, 2019.

On February 17, 2020, Galvin starred in Manhattan Concert Productions' one-night-only 50th Anniversary concert presentation of Joseph and the Amazing Technicolor Dreamcoat at Lincoln Center.

In 2020, Galvin joined the cast of the television series The Good Doctor in the recurring role of Dr. Asher Wolke. In 2021, he was promoted to season regular for their upcoming fifth season.

On June 9, 2022, it was announced that Galvin would star in the musical comedy film Theater Camp, inspired by the 2020 short film of the same name co-written with partner Ben Platt, Molly Gordon, and Nick Lieberman. The film had its world premiere at the 2023 Sundance Film Festival on January 21, 2023.

In December 2022, Galvin starred in Meet Cute's holiday rom-com, Christmasuzannukkah, alongside with Amy Sedaris. "As a Jew who loves Christmas and Amy Sedaris, I jumped at the opportunity to celebrate both," said Galvin. "I think everyone will find something to love about Christmasuzannukkah."

Personal life
Galvin is gay; he came out to his mother when he was 14 years old. As of February 2019 he splits his time between Manhattan and Los Angeles, California. On January 12, 2020, Galvin began a relationship with actor-singer Ben Platt, whom Galvin replaced in the title role of Dear Evan Hansen in 2017. They announced their engagement on November 25, 2022.

Acting credits

Film

Television

Theatre

Audio

See also

 LGBT culture in New York City
 List of LGBT people from New York City

References

External links
 
 
 

1994 births
American male child actors
American male television actors
American people of Irish descent
American people of Italian descent
American gay actors
American gay musicians
Jewish American male actors
LGBT people from New York (state)
Living people
Male actors from New York (state)
People from Katonah, New York
American LGBT singers
Gay singers
Gay Jews
20th-century LGBT people
21st-century LGBT people
21st-century American Jews